6-ty ostatni przystanek is the name of the 2004 album by Polish band Ich Troje, released on Decca Records. The album is known as 6. ostatni przystanek in the native Polish.  All tracks are in the Polish language.

Track listing
 "Szósty przystanek"
 "Spojrzenia mówią wszystko"
 "Jak mogłeś"
 "Czerwona smycz"
 "Homo homini lupus"
 "Pytania i odpowiedzi"
 "Don’t go west"
 "Spadaj"
 "Rossie z Łodzi"
 "Sexappeal"
 "Taniec"
 "Letnia piosenka o niczym ważnym"
 "Skłamałem"
 "Chciałabym"
 "Requiem"
 "Ostatni przystanek"

Charts and certifications

Charts

Certifications

References

Ich Troje albums
2004 albums